Zeynabad (also Romanized as Zeynābād, ZaĪnābād, and Zein Abad) is a village in Pishkuh Rural District, in the Central District of Taft County, Yazd Province, Iran. At the 2006 census, its population was 11, in 4 families.

References 

Populated places in Taft County